Pigeon Roost or Pigeonroost may refer to:

Horse Creek (Kentucky), location of Pigeon Roost Creek and Pigeonroost post office
Pigeon Roost, Mississippi, a ghost town in Choctaw County
Pigeonroost, North Carolina, an unincorporated community in Mitchell County
Pigeon Roost Creek (Indiana), a stream
Pigeon Roost Creek (Missouri), a stream
Pigeon Roost State Historic Site, near Underwood, Indiana

See also
Upper Pidgeonroost, Kentucky, an unincorporated community in Perry County